Eun-ah is a Korean feminine given name. Its meaning differs based on the hanja used to write each syllable of the name. There are 30 hanja with the reading "eun" and 40 hanja with the reading  "ah" on the South Korean government's official list of hanja which may be used in given names.

People with this name include:

Ko Eun-ah (actress, born 1946), South Korean actress
Hong Eun-ah (born 1980), South Korean football referee
Go Eun-ah (born Bang Hyo-jin, 1988), South Korean actress
Seo Eun-ah (born 1989), South Korean actress

See also
List of Korean given names
Euna Lee (born 1972), South Korean-born American journalist
Euna Kim (born 1994), American rapper in South Korea

References

Korean feminine given names